Palaephatus leucacrotus is a moth of the  family Palaephatidae. It is found in the wetter areas of the Valdivian forest region of south-central Chile.

The length of the forewings is 6–7 mm for males and 6.5–7 mm for females. Adults have dark fuscous forewings irregularly mottled with light brown and white. There is a large white spot on the termen. They are on wing from October to December in one generation per year.

Etymology
The species name is derived
from Greek leuko (meaning white) and akrotes (meaning extremity or tip) and refers to the large white terminal spot on the forewings.

References

Moths described in 1986
Palaephatidae
Taxa named by Donald R. Davis (entomologist)
Endemic fauna of Chile